Christian Junior Nzila Goma (born 17 April 2001) is a French footballer who plays as a midfielder for Chiasso.

Career

In 2019, Nzila signed for Swiss second division side Chiasso. After that, he was sent on loan to FC Paradiso in the Swiss fourth division, where he said, "I had to take the train to go there, it was not easy". In 2020, Nzila was sent on loan to Italian Serie A club Napoli. In 2021, he was sent on loan to CSKA Sofia in Bulgaria. On 17 July 2021, he debuted for CSKA Sofia during a 0–4 loss to Ludogorets.

Personal life
Born in France, Nzila is of Congolese descent.

Career statistics

Club
As of 22 May 2022

References

External links
 
 

2001 births
Living people
French footballers
French sportspeople of Democratic Republic of the Congo descent
Association football midfielders
French expatriate sportspeople in Italy
French expatriate sportspeople in Bulgaria
French expatriate sportspeople in Switzerland
French expatriate footballers

Swiss Challenge League players
First Professional Football League (Bulgaria) players
FC Chiasso players
PFC CSKA Sofia players
Expatriate footballers in Italy
Expatriate footballers in Bulgaria
Expatriate footballers in Switzerland
Black French sportspeople